In Greek mythology, Galas (Ancient Greek: Γάλας Gálas) was the eponymous founder of the Gauls. He was the son of Polyphemos and Galatea and the brother of Illyrius and Celtus.

Notes

Characters in Greek mythology